The following highways are numbered 33:

International
 Asian Highway 33
 European route E33

Australia
 South Arm Highway (Tasmania)

Canada
 Alberta Highway 33
 British Columbia Highway 33
 Bedford Bypass, also known as Nova Scotia Trunk 33
 Ontario Highway 33
 Saskatchewan Highway 33

Czech Republic
 I/33 Highway; Czech: Silnice I/33

Iceland
 Route 33 (Iceland)

India
  National Highway 33 (India)
 UP-SH-33(Mathura - Bareilly) (India)

Iran
 Road 33

Ireland
  N33 road (Ireland)

Italy
 Autostrada A33

Japan
 Japan National Route 33

Korea, South
 National Route 33

New Zealand
 New Zealand State Highway 33

Poland 
  National road 33 (DK33)

Turkey
  , a motorway in Turkey

United Kingdom
 British A33 (Southampton-Reading)

United States
 U.S. Route 33
 Alabama State Route 33
 Arkansas Highway 33
 Arkansas Highway 33C
 California State Route 33
 County Route J33 (California)
 County Route S33 (California)
 Connecticut Route 33
 Florida State Road 33
 County Road 33 (Lake County, Florida)
 Georgia State Route 33
 Hawaii Route 33 (former)
 Idaho State Highway 33
 Illinois Route 33
 Indiana State Road 33 (former)
 County Road 33 (Elkhart County, Indiana)
 K-33 (Kansas highway)
 Kentucky Route 33
 Louisiana Highway 33
 Louisiana State Route 33 (former)
 Maryland Route 33
 Massachusetts Route 33
 M-33 (Michigan highway)
 Minnesota State Highway 33
 County Road 33 (Ramsey County, Minnesota)
 County Road 33 (Sherburne County, Minnesota)
 Mississippi Highway 33
 Missouri Route 33
 Nebraska Highway 33
 Nevada State Route 33 (former)
 New Hampshire Route 33
 New Jersey Route 33
 County Route 33 (Bergen County, New Jersey)
 County Route S33 (Bergen County, New Jersey)
 County Route 33 (Monmouth County, New Jersey)
 New York State Route 33
 County Route 33 (Broome County, New York)
 County Route 33 (Cattaraugus County, New York)
 County Route 33 (Chautauqua County, New York)
 County Route 33 (Dutchess County, New York)
 County Route 33 (Erie County, New York)
 County Route 33 (Lewis County, New York)
 County Route 33 (Onondaga County, New York)
 County Route 33 (Ontario County, New York)
 County Route 33 (Orange County, New York)
 County Route 33 (Oswego County, New York)
 County Route 33 (Otsego County, New York)
 County Route 33 (Putnam County, New York)
 County Route 33 (Rockland County, New York)
 County Route 33 (Saratoga County, New York)
 County Route 33 (Schenectady County, New York)
 County Route 33 (Schoharie County, New York)
 County Route 33 (Suffolk County, New York)
 County Route 33 (Sullivan County, New York)
 County Route 33 (Tioga County, New York)
 County Route 33 (Ulster County, New York)
 County Route 33 (Yates County, New York)
 North Carolina Highway 33
 North Dakota Highway 33 (former)
 Ohio State Route 33 (1923) (former)
 Oklahoma State Highway 33
 Pennsylvania Route 33
 Rhode Island Route 33
 South Carolina Highway 33
 Tennessee State Route 33
 Texas State Highway 33
 Texas State Highway Spur 33
 Ranch to Market Road 33
 Texas Park Road 33
 Utah State Route 33 (former)
 Virginia State Route 33
 Virginia State Route 33 (1923–1933) (former)
 Virginia State Route 33 (1933-1938) (former)
 West Virginia Route 33
 Wisconsin Highway 33
 Wyoming Highway 33

Territories
 Guam Highway 33
 Puerto Rico Highway 33
 U.S. Virgin Islands Highway 33

See also
A33 (disambiguation)#Roads
List of highways numbered 33A
List of highways numbered 33B